Nuvvu Nenu is a 2001 Indian Telugu-language romantic drama film directed by Teja who co-wrote it with Dasaradh. The film stars Uday Kiran and Anita while Sunil, Banerjee, Tanikella Bharani, Dharmavarapu Subramanyam, and Telangana Shakuntala play the supporting roles. This is the official debut film of Anita Hassanandani.

Released on 10 August 2001, the film was a commercial success. It won four Filmfare Awards South, including Best Film – Telugu and five Nandi Awards in various categories.

Plot 
Ravi is the son of a multimillionaire in Hyderabad. Vasundhara is the daughter of a milk supplier. Ravi and Vasundhara study in the same college. The film starts with Vasundhara showing hatred towards Ravi, as he is a sportsman who is not good at studies. Over a period of time, her hatred turns into love. Finally, he falls in love with her too, but their parents do not agree to their marriage. Their parents plan to avoid their marriage by giving the couple a clause that they should not meet each other for one year. If their love remains even after one year then their parents will agree to their marriage.

Ravi's father puts him under house arrest in Mumbai. while Vasundhara's father takes her to his hometown and arranges her marriage with another man. However both Ravi and Vasundara manage to escape. They reach a garden where they spend a lot of days working for money. But Ravi's father sends goons to bring back his son. In the end both of them get married in front of the Legislative Assembly where their whole college comes to support them

Cast

Uday Kiran as Ravi
Anita Hassanandani as Vasundhara
Sunil as College Youth
Banerjee as Killer
Tanikella Bharani
Radhika Chaudhari as Priya
 Supriya Karnik as Rajendar's friend
M. S. Narayana as Principal
Ahuti Prasad as Police officer
Rallapalli as Caretaker
Dharmavarapu Subramanyam as Accounts lecturer
 Vizag Prasad as Rajendra
Telangana Shakuntala
Sangeetha
Madhunandan

Production 
Teja contacted Madhavan's spokesperson to sign the actor for the lead role in his film. However, his spokesperson denied the offer citing Madhavan's disinterest in acting in Telugu films. Thus, the role went to Uday Kiran.

Soundtrack
The music was composed by R. P. Patnaik.

Reception 
Griddaluru Gopalrao of Zamin Ryot praised the film's writing. "For an ordinary story, Teja has written an extra-ordinary screenplay [sic]," Gopalrao added. Jeevi of Idlebrain opined that "A simple story can be told in a simple manner. But the director used every possible technique to insert the twists and unwanted violence in this film".

Accolades

Remakes
This movie was remade into Hindi as Yeh Dil (2003), in Tamil as Madurai Veeran (2007) and in Bengali as Dujone (2009). Hassanandani reprised her role in the Hindi version.

Notes

References

External links
 

2001 films
2000s Telugu-language films
Telugu films remade in other languages
Indian teen romance films
2001 romantic drama films
Films directed by Teja (film director)
Indian romantic drama films
Films scored by R. P. Patnaik
2000s teen romance films